Clark Dwaine Phillips III (born December 19, 2001) is an American football cornerback for the Utah Utes. He was named a unanimous All-American and the Pac-12 Defensive Player of the Year in 2022.

High school career
Phillips III attended La Habra High School in La Habra, California. As a senior in 2019, he was the Orange County Register Defensive Player of the Year. He originally committed to Ohio State University to play college football but changed to the University of Utah. He was the highest rated recruit to ever sign with Utah.

College career
Phillips III became an immediate starter his true freshman year in 2020. He started all five games, recording 25 tackles, one interception and one touchdown. He again started all 14 games in 2021 and had 63 tackles, two interceptions and one touchdown.

References

External links
Utah Utes bio

Living people
2001 births
All-American college football players
American football cornerbacks
People from Lakewood, California
Players of American football from Los Angeles
Sportspeople from Los Angeles County, California
Utah Utes football players